Mount Everett State Reservation is a public recreation area in the towns of Mount Washington and Sheffield, Massachusetts, that offers panoramic views of Massachusetts, Connecticut, and New York from the summit of  Mount Everett. The reservation abuts Jug End State Reservation and Wildlife Management Area; Bash Bish Falls State Park and Mount Washington State Forest lie to the west. All are managed by the Massachusetts Department of Conservation and Recreation.

History
The state legislature established the Mount Everett Reservation Commission in 1908. The commission was provided a fund of $5000 to purchase land in the towns of Mount Washington and Sheffield that would become the Mount Everett State Reservation. By 1912, a little over half of the appropriation had been used to purchase 815 acres. The commission was abolished in 1975 when management of the reservation was transferred to the Department of Natural Resources.

Old growth forest
The forest contains eastern hemlock, eastern white pine, and hardwoods such as sugar and red maple, white and northern red oak, American beech, and sweet and yellow birch. Old-growth forest with a similar composition occurs around Guilder Pond. Mount Everett's summit supports a dwarf forest of pitch pine and bear oak that, aside from clearing for a fire tower and trails, has not been disturbed for centuries.

Activities and amenities
The Appalachian Trail traverses the entire length of the reservation from south to north, crossing the summit of Mount Everett as it does. Additional trails are available for hiking and cross-country skiing. Picnicking and canoeing are found at Guilder Pond.

References

External links
Mount Everett State Reservation Department of Conservation and Recreation
Mt. Washington State Forest Trail Map Department of Conservation and Recreation

State parks of Massachusetts
Taconic Mountains
Parks in Berkshire County, Massachusetts
Mount Washington, Massachusetts